Group E of the 2018 FIFA World Cup took place from 17 to 27 June 2018. The group consisted of Brazil, Switzerland, Costa Rica, and Serbia. The top two teams, Brazil and Switzerland, advanced to the round of 16.

Brazil, Serbia and Switzerland played in the same group at the following FIFA World Cup.

Teams

Notes

Standings

In the round of 16:
The winners of Group E, Brazil, advanced to play the runners-up of Group F, Mexico.
The runners-up of Group E, Switzerland, advanced to play the winners of Group F, Sweden.

Matches
All times listed are local time.

Costa Rica vs Serbia
The two teams had never met before.

Both defences were tested in the opening moments -  Aleksandar Mitrović seeing an effort hooked off the line before Giancarlo González headed straight at Vladimir Stojković at the other end. The Serbian team was almost punished for their lack of penetration when Francisco Calvo dragged a strike wide as Costa Rica enjoyed a short spell of possession just before the break. Aleksandar Kolarov’s left-footed free-kick from the right flew into the top-right corner. Serbia's Nemanja Matić, meanwhile, was involved in a confrontation with a member of the Costa Rica coaching staff in injury time as he tried to retrieve the ball after it went out of play.

Serbia have won their opening game at a World Cup tournament for the first time since 1998, when they did so as Yugoslavia against Iran (1–0). Costa Rica suffered their first defeat at the World Cup since 2006 (1–2 v Poland), ending a run of five games unbeaten in the competition (W2 D3). Kolarov's strike was the first direct free-kick scored by a Serbia/Yugoslavia player at a World Cup tournament since 1998, when Siniša Mihajlović netted against Iran. Kolarov's goal for Serbia was the third direct free-kick scored at this year's World Cup (after Russia's Aleksandr Golovin and Portugal's Cristiano Ronaldo), which is already as many as there were in the entire 2014 tournament in Brazil.

Brazil vs Switzerland
The two teams had met in eight matches, including one game at the 1950 FIFA World Cup group stage, a 2–2 draw.

Paulinho's close-range effort forced Yann Sommer into a save. The first goal was scored shortly after when Philippe Coutinho scored from outside the penalty area with a right foot shot. Brazil also came close before the break as Thiago Silva headed inches over the crossbar. Five minutes into the second half, Steven Zuber equalised with a controversial header after a corner from the right decided by VAR review when he appeared to push Miranda in the back. More controversy was caused in the 73rd minute, after Gabriel Jesus was denied a penalty after being hacked down by Manuel Akanji in the penalty area. Brazil came close several times during the closing minutes, but Neymar, Roberto Firmino, and Miranda were unable to garner goals.

Brazil have failed to win any of their last three World Cup matches (D1 L2), their worst winless run since June 1978, when they went four games without a win. Valon Behrami is the first Switzerland player in history to appear at four World Cups. Brazil failed to win their opening match at the World Cup for the first time since 1978, when they drew 1–1 with Sweden.

Brazil vs Costa Rica
The two teams had met in ten matches, including two games at the FIFA World Cup's group stages, in 1990 and 2002, with both ending in a victory for Brazil's (1–0 and 5–2, respectively).

Celso Borges shot an effort wide of the target from a Cristian Gamboa cutback after 13 minutes. Gabriel Jesus shot into the back of the net from an offside position in the 25th minute. Marcelo shot a low drive five minutes from the break, which Keylor Navas stopped. After the break, Jesus headed against the crossbar before Navas diverted Philippe Coutinho's follow-up wide. Neymar curled around the right-hand post from 18 yards in the 72nd minute, before the officials arrived at the correct decision via VAR to deny him a penalty. Coutinho gave Brazil the lead in the 91st minute, when he burst into the box to get on the end of a Roberto Firmino nod down and a touch from Jesus before poking the ball low to the net. Neymar then tapped home Douglas Costa's chipped cross from the right from close range deeper into the stoppage time.

Neymar's strike seven minutes into stoppage time was the latest ever at a World Cup in regular time. This was Brazil's first World Cup victory thanks to a goal scored in the 90th minute. Costa Rica were knocked out of the tournament after this game for the first time since 2006, with a game to play. In addition, with Germany having won the all-time record of most World Cup goals by any team with 224 goals after their win against Argentina in the final of the previous World Cup, Neymar's goal successfully tied up the record with Germany.

Serbia vs Switzerland

The two teams had never met. Playing as Yugoslavia, the two teams met 13 times, including one game at the 1950 FIFA World Cup group stage, a 3–0 victory for Yugoslavia.

Dušan Tadić checked back onto his left foot to send in a cross from the right that Aleksandar Mitrović met with a header into the left side of the net. Blerim Džemaili shot wide from inside the penalty area. Serbia pressed and Sergej Milinković-Savić shot narrowly wide with a rising 20-yard drive. With almost half an hour played Steven Zuber passed the ball to Džemaili who drew a one-handed save from Vladimir Stojković down to the goalkeeper's right. After 52 minutes, Xherdan Shaqiri's shot rebounded back to Granit Xhaka and the midfielder curled a right-footed shot into the far corner of the net from 25 yards. Shaqiri hit the frame of the goal with a bending effort from the right. Switzerland substitute Mario Gavranović was flagged offside as he hit the side-netting. And, in the final minute of normal time, Gavranović played a throughball to Shaqiri, who outpaced Duško Tošić and ran from near the half-way line into the box before nutmegging Stojković with a low finish from the left.

Stephan Lichtsteiner made his ninth World Cup appearance for Switzerland in this game, breaking the national record held by Charles Antenen since 1962.

Serbia vs Brazil
The two teams had met once, a 2014 friendly won by Brazil 1–0. Playing as Yugoslavia, the two teams met 18 times, including four times at FIFA World Cup's group stages in 1930, 1950, 1954 and 1974, with one victory each and two draws.

Marcelo was replaced with Filipe Luís in the 10th minute, due to a back spasm. Gabriel Jesus created a chance for Neymar, whose cross-goal strike was pushed away by Vladimir Stojković. Jesus cut inside of Miloš Veljković and saw his shot blocked behind by Nikola Milenković. In the 36th minute, Paulinho raced between two defenders and poked Philippe Coutinho's delivery beyond the onrushing Stojković. Neymar had a low drive kept out by Stojković at the near post five minutes into the second period. Aleksandar Mitrović headed a cross from Antonio Rukavina straight at the feet of the keeper in the 65th minute. Thiago Silva headed home at the near post from Neymar's left-wing corner in the 68th minute.

Brazil have qualified from the group stage of the World Cup for the 13th consecutive tournament, a run stretching back to 1970. Brazil have now won back-to-back World Cup matches for the first time since 2010, when they won their opening two group matches. For Serbia, this was the second consecutive elimination from the group stage in their World Cup history as an independent nation. Also, after Germany's previous match with Sweden where Germany initially managed to restore the all-time record of World Cup goals by any team with 226 goals, just as Brazil have managed to tie up the record of 224 goals after Neymar's goal in the match against Costa Rica, they have done it again in this match with Thiago Silva's goal that has now brought them to 226 goals with Germany.

Switzerland vs Costa Rica
The two teams had faced each other twice, most recently in a 2010 friendly won by Costa Rica 1–0.

Stephan Lichtsteiner's right-wing cross was headed back across goal by Breel Embolo, and the unmarked Blerim Džemaili lashed home from eight yards. Keylor Navas blocked Embolo's effort at his near post, before Kendall Waston headed Joel Campbell's outswinging corner from six yards after 56 minutes. Josip Drmić slotted into the bottom corner from Denis Zakaria's low cross. Referee awarded a spot-kick after Bryan Ruiz had been bundled over in the area, only for the decision to be reversed after replays showed that he had strayed into an offside position when he received the ball. Ruiz did get a chance from the spot in the third minute of stoppage time when Campbell was felled in the box, his penalty hit the bar and then bounced in off Yann Sommer's head for an own goal.

Waston's goal for Costa Rica was their first in 424 minutes of play in World Cup matches (not including penalty shootouts), with their previous goal scored by Ruiz in the last 16 of the 2014 tournament against Greece. Switzerland have avoided defeat in each of their three group stage matches at the World Cup for the first time since 2006. Costa Rica became the last side to score a goal at Russia 2018. Sommer is just the third goalkeeper to score an own goal at the World Cup, after Honduras' Noel Valladares against France in 2014 and Spain's Andoni Zubizarreta against Nigeria in 1998.

Discipline
Fair play points would have been used as tiebreakers if the overall and head-to-head records of teams were tied. These were calculated based on yellow and red cards received in all group matches as follows:
first yellow card: minus 1 point;
indirect red card (second yellow card): minus 3 points;
direct red card: minus 4 points;
yellow card and direct red card: minus 5 points;

Only one of the above deductions were applied to a player in a single match.

References

External links

 2018 FIFA World Cup Group E, FIFA.com

2018 FIFA World Cup
Brazil at the 2018 FIFA World Cup
Switzerland at the 2018 FIFA World Cup
Costa Rica at the 2018 FIFA World Cup
Serbia at the 2018 FIFA World Cup